The list of current and past Rajya Sabha members from the Kerala State. State elect 9 members for the term of 6 years and indirectly elected by the state legislators, since year 1956.

Alphabetical list of all Rajya Sabha members from Kerala state 
Alphabetical list by last name

The list is incomplete.
 Star (*) represents current Rajya Sabha members from KL State.

People from Kerala who were nominated in Rajyasabha from other states

People from Kerala who were nominated members in Rajyasabha

See also 

 List of current MPs from Kerala

References

External links

Rajya Sabha homepage hosted by the Indian government
List of Sitting Members of Rajya Sabha (Term Wise) 
MEMBERS OF RAJYA SABHA (STATE WISE RETIREMENT LIST) 

Kerala
 
Rajya Sabha
Rajya Sabha